The Midland Great Western Railway (MGWR) Class P were an 0-6-0T tank locomotive designed by Martin Atock introduced in 1881 designed for shunting and banking round North Wall freight yard. After 1925 they became Great Southern Railways (GSR) class 614 / Inchicore class J10.

Fleet

The MGWR P class were known as Heavy Tanks.  In particular No. 102 was rebuilt with armour-plating in 1922 and was unofficially known as King Tutenkamen.

References

0-6-0T locomotives
5 ft 3 in gauge locomotives
Railway locomotives introduced in 1881
Steam locomotives of Ireland
P
Scrapped locomotives